South Peninsula High School is a secondary school in Diep River, a suburb of Cape Town, South Africa. The school celebrated its 60th anniversary in 2010, after opening in 1950.

South Peninsula High School accepts many students from historically disadvantaged areas in Cape Town including Mitchells Plain, Grassy Park, Lotus River, Heathfield, Strandfontein and Retreat. The school is twinned with Great Sankey High School, in Warrington, England, and used to run an exchange programme for staff and students.

Alumni 
Notable alumni of the school include
 Riaad Moosa, comedian

References

External links
 Official website

Schools in Cape Town
1950 establishments in South Africa